Bocchetti is a surname. Notable people with the surname include:

Salvatore Bocchetti (born 1986), Italian footballer 
Antonio Bocchetti (born 1980), Italian footballer
Antonio Bocchetti (born 1990), Italian footballer
Mike Bocchetti, American comedian, actor, and writer